Lichenopora is a genus of bryozoans belonging to the family Lichenoporidae.

The genus has cosmopolitan distribution.

Species:

Lichenopora aldingensis 
Lichenopora annularis 
Lichenopora australis 
Lichenopora bassleri 
Lichenopora betsibokensis 
Lichenopora boletiformis 
Lichenopora bueltenensis 
Lichenopora burdigalensis 
Lichenopora butzmanni 
Lichenopora californica 
Lichenopora canui 
Lichenopora castanyi 
Lichenopora cavernosa 
Lichenopora cochloidea 
Lichenopora conica 
Lichenopora convergens 
Lichenopora convexa 
Lichenopora costata 
Lichenopora cribraria 
Lichenopora cyatiformis 
Lichenopora davidi 
Lichenopora defranciana 
Lichenopora depressa 
Lichenopora diadema
Lichenopora discoplanata 
Lichenopora elegantissima 
Lichenopora elliptica 
Lichenopora erecta 
Lichenopora falunica 
Lichenopora fasciculifera 
Lichenopora fava 
Lichenopora filifera 
Lichenopora foveolata 
Lichenopora fungicula 
Lichenopora gregoryi 
Lichenopora grignonensis 
Lichenopora huillereti 
Lichenopora interradiata 
Lichenopora interrupta 
Lichenopora intricata 
Lichenopora irregularis 
Lichenopora japonica 
Lichenopora lamellosa 
Lichenopora lecointrei 
Lichenopora loveni 
Lichenopora macropora 
Lichenopora magnicentralis 
Lichenopora magnifica 
Lichenopora meandriformis 
Lichenopora mellevillensis 
Lichenopora mucronata 
Lichenopora multifascigera 
Lichenopora neocomiensis 
Lichenopora nevianii 
Lichenopora orbignyana 
Lichenopora orientalis 
Lichenopora parva 
Lichenopora pedunculata 
Lichenopora perneri 
Lichenopora picoensis 
Lichenopora placenta 
Lichenopora porosa 
Lichenopora prolifica 
Lichenopora proposita 
Lichenopora quincuncialis 
Lichenopora radiata 
Lichenopora radiuscula 
Lichenopora reussi 
Lichenopora rifensis 
Lichenopora rogeri 
Lichenopora schoelleri 
Lichenopora spinata 
Lichenopora stellata
Lichenopora stelliformis 
Lichenopora strougoi 
Lichenopora tenuifasciculifera 
Lichenopora tubicen 
Lichenopora tubulifera 
Lichenopora turbinata 
Lichenopora vireti 
Lichenopora wilsoni

References

Bryozoan genera